Emilia Cano Camacho (born March 4, 1968, in Barcelona) is a retired female race walker from Spain.

International competitions

References

1968 births
Living people
Spanish female racewalkers
Athletes (track and field) at the 1992 Summer Olympics
Olympic athletes of Spain
Athletes from Barcelona